The Democratic Party of the Philippines is a center-right, populist political party in the Philippines founded in 2010 by Dr. Ernesto G. Ramos. It seeks to be an alternative to traditional politics.

History
The party was established in 2010 by Ernesto G. Ramos, aiming to have a party that is an alternative to traditional politics.

2013 general election 
In the 2013 general elections, the party fielded Greco Belgica, Baldomero Falcone and Christian Señeres as its candidates for the senate. All three candidates failed to secure a seat.

2022 Philippine presidential election 
In the 2022 Philippine presidential election, Jose Montemayor Jr. ran unsuccessfully for president under the party's banner with Rizalito David as his running mate.

Electoral performance

President

Vice president

Senate

House of Representatives 

Populist parties
Political parties established in 2010
Centrist parties in the Philippines
2010 establishments in the Philippines